Maltahöhe is a village in southern central Namibia close to the Swartrand escarpment, about 110 km west of Mariental in the Hardap Region. It has about 6,000 inhabitants and owns about 17,000 hectares of land. Maltahöhe has two suburbs, the Andreville location and the Blikkiesdorp (literally ) informal settlement which has neither sewerage nor electricity supply.

History
Maltahöhe was established in 1899 by Henning von Burgsdorff, previously an officer in the German Schutztruppe, the military force of the Imperial German occupation. Burgsdorff named the place after his wife Malta. After the end of the German colonial era in South West Africa the settlement became a small hub for tourism, serving as gateway to popular destinations like the Sossusvlei, Solitaire, Sesriem, and Duwisib Castle. The Maltahöhe Hotel was founded in 1907 and is the oldest country hotel in Namibia.

Business and development
Maltahöhe has been in steady decline for a number of decades. There is no retail store in town; the last one stopped business before 1980. Until after the year 2000 Maltahöhe used to have town status. Due to mismanagement and infighting between councillors it was downgraded to "village". Since then many businesspeople have left and unemployment has risen. There is no secondary school, only a primary school and the Daweb Junior Secondary School.

The town used to be a centre for karakul sheep farming, but this branch of agriculture has likewise been shrinking. Unemployment is high with only about 500 residents in possession of some sort of job. Alcohol abuse is common, particularly in the suburbs.

Politics
Maltahöhe is governed by a village council that  has five seats.

The 2010 local authority election was won by the SWAPO party which gained three seats. One seat each was won by the All People's Party (APP) and the Rally for Democracy and Progress (RDP). SWAPO also won the 2015 election and gained four seats (511 votes). The remaining seat went to the APP which obtained 109 votes.

The 2020 local authority election was won by the newly formed Landless People's Movement (LPM) which scored well all over Hardap. LPM gained 685 votes and three seats in the village council. SWAPO took the remaining two seats with 330 votes.

References

Populated places in the Hardap Region
Populated places established in 1899
1899 establishments in German South West Africa
Villages in Namibia